Richard Marlow is a British supercar producer and founder of Ultima Sports Ltd.

Career 
Marlow is the joint founder of the sports car manufacturing company Ultima Sports Ltd, who make the series of Le Mans inspired Ultima supercars. Richard Marlow is the mastermind behind its most successful models; the Ultima GTR, Ultima Evolution and Ultima RS. 

Between 2004 and 2009, Marlow focused on acquiring multiple world speed records for production road cars in the Ultima GTR, and was the driver of the car during each successful world record attempt. Ultima Sports Ltd has become widely recognized as one of the most successful British independent hand built sports car manufacturers of all time.

References

Living people